William Hanes Ayres (February 5, 1916 – December 27, 2000) was an American World War II veteran and politician who served as a Republican member of the U.S. House of Representatives from Ohio from 1951 to 1971.

Early life and career 
William H. Ayres was born in Eagle Rock, Virginia. He moved with his parents to West Virginia and later to Lorain County, Ohio. He attended the Weller Township High School, and graduated from Western Reserve University in Cleveland, Ohio, in 1936. He worked as a salesman for heating equipment in Akron, Ohio, from 1936 to 1944.  

He was president of the Ayres Heating & Insulation Co., Akron, Ohio, since 1946.

World War II 
During the Second World War he served as a private in the United States Army until being discharged December 17, 1945.

Congress 
Ayres was elected as a Republican to the Eighty-second and to the nine succeeding Congresses.  Ayres was well regarded by House members of both parties.  He usually did not list his party affiliation on his campaign literature instead listing himself as "Your Congressman."

He was an unsuccessful candidate for reelection in 1970 to the Ninety-second Congress defeated by John Seiberling, an Akron Democrat and scion. Ayres voted in favor of the Civil Rights Acts of 1957, 1960, 1964, and 1968, and the Voting Rights Act of 1965.

Death and family legacy 
He died of heart and kidney ailments on December 27, 2000, in Columbia, Maryland. Interment at Arlington National Cemetery.

Representative Ayres's wife of 61 years, Mary Helen Coventry Ayres, died in 1999.

He had two daughters, Virginia Mount Ayres of Alexandria, Virginia, and Judith Elizabeth Ayres Burke of Middleburg, Virginia. A son, Frank Hanes Ayres, died in 1991.

References

 Retrieved on March 28, 2010
The Political Graveyard

1916 births
2000 deaths
United States Army personnel of World War II
Politicians from Akron, Ohio
Burials at Arlington National Cemetery
Case Western Reserve University alumni
United States Army soldiers
Deaths from kidney disease
Candidates in the 1970 United States elections
20th-century American politicians
People from Botetourt County, Virginia
Businesspeople from Virginia
Businesspeople from Akron, Ohio
20th-century American businesspeople
Republican Party members of the United States House of Representatives from Ohio